Paul L. Douglas (1927-2012) was an American lawyer and politician who served as Nebraska Attorney General from 1975 until his resignation in 1984.

Douglas was a local prosecutor in Lancaster County, Nebraska until he was elected state Attorney General in 1974. He was re-elected in 1978 and in 1982.

In 1984, Douglas was impeached by the Nebraska Legislature for "allegedly lying about his dealings with an insolvent bank (Commonwealth Savings Company of Lincoln) and failing to investigate the institution." He was the only Nebraska official impeached in the 20th century. The Nebraska Supreme Court tried Douglas's impeachment and found him not guilty, allowing him to remain in office.

Seven months later, he was tried and found guilty of felony perjury, and resigned his office. Those charges were dismissed on appeal. He was later disbarred.

Personal life 
Douglas was born on September 19, 1927 in Sioux Falls, South Dakota. He enlisted in the United States Marine Corps and served two years during World War II, and later in the Korean War. Douglas attended Augustana University and the University of Nebraska College of Law.

Douglas died in Lincoln, Nebraska on November 5, 2012 at the age of 85.

References

1927 births
2012 deaths
American perjurers
United States officials impeached by state or territorial governments
Nebraska Attorneys General
Nebraska lawyers
Nebraska Republicans
Politicians from Lincoln, Nebraska
Politicians from Sioux Falls, South Dakota
Military personnel from South Dakota
Nebraska politicians convicted of crimes
20th-century American lawyers